Gustav Georg Friedrich Maria Krupp von Bohlen und Halbach (born Gustav von Bohlen und Halbach; 7 August 1870 – 16 January 1950) was a German foreign service official who became chairman of the board of Friedrich Krupp AG, a heavy industry conglomerate, after his marriage to Bertha Krupp, who had inherited the company. He and his son Alfried would lead the company through two world wars, producing almost everything for the German war machine from U-boats, battleships, howitzers, trains, railway guns, machine guns, cars, tanks, and much more. Krupp produced the Tiger I tank, Big Bertha and the Paris Gun, among other inventions, under Gustav. Following World War II, plans to prosecute him as a war criminal at the 1945 Nuremberg Trials were dropped because by then he was bedridden, senile, and considered medically unfit for trial. The charges against him were held in abeyance in case he were found fit for trial.

Early life

Gustav Krupp von Bohlen und Halbach was born Gustav von Bohlen und Halbach in The Hague in 1870. He was a grandson of Henry Bohlen and related to Charles E. Bohlen and Karoline of Wartensleben. He married Bertha Krupp in October 1906. Bertha had inherited her family's company in 1902 at age 16 after the death of her father, Friedrich Alfred Krupp. German Emperor Kaiser William II personally led a search for a suitable spouse for Bertha, as the Krupp empire could not be headed by a woman. Gustav was picked from his previous post at the Vatican.  The Kaiser announced at the wedding that Gustav would be allowed to add the Krupp name to his own. Gustav became company chairman in 1909.

After 1910, the Krupp company became a member and major funder of the Pan-German League (Alldeutscher Verband) which mobilised popular support in favour of two army bills, in 1912 and 1913, to raise Germany's standing army to 738,000 men.

World War I

By World War I, the company had a near monopoly in heavy arms manufacture in Germany. At the start of the war, the company lost access to most of its overseas markets, but this was more than offset by increased demand for weapons by Germany and her allies (Central Powers). In 1902, before Krupp's marriage, the company leased a fuse patent to Vickers Limited of the United Kingdom. Among the company's products was a 94-ton howitzer named Big Bertha, after Krupp's wife, and the Paris Gun.  Gustav also won the lucrative contract for Germany's U-boats, which were built at the family's shipyard in Kiel. Krupp's estate, the Villa Hügel, had a suite of rooms for Wilhelm II whenever he came to visit.

Interwar years

During the occupation of the Ruhr in 1923, a French military court had Krupp imprisoned for seven months until the German government stopped their politics of passive resistance.

The Versailles Treaty prevented Germany from making armaments and submarines, forcing Krupp to significantly reduce his labour force. His company diversified to agricultural equipment, vehicles and consumer goods. However, using the profits from the Vickers patent deal and subsidies from the Weimar government, Krupp secretly began the rearming of Germany with the ink barely dry on the treaty of Versailles. It secretly continued to work on artillery through subsidiaries in Sweden, and built submarine pens in the Netherlands. In the 1930s, it restarted manufacture of tanks such as the Tiger I and other war materials, again using foreign subsidiaries.

Krupp was a member of the Prussian State Council from 1921 to 1933. Krupp was an avowed monarchist, but his first loyalty was to whoever held power.  He once left a business meeting in disgust when another industrialist, who was the one hosting the meeting, referred to the late President Friedrich Ebert as "that saddlemaker" (Der Sattelhersteller).

Krupp initially opposed the Nazis, yet at the secret meeting with Adolf Hitler and leading German industrialists on February 20, 1933, he contributed one million Reichsmark to the Nazi party's fund for the March 1933 election, which enabled Hitler to take control of the government. After Hitler won power, Krupp became, as Fritz Thyssen later put it, "a super Nazi", and contributed to the Adolf Hitler Fund of German Trade and Industry which was established in June 1933 to support the NSDAP. As president of the Reichsverband of German industry he led the effort to expel its Jewish members.

Like many German nationalists, Krupp believed that the Nazis could be used to end the Republic, and then be pushed aside to restore the Kaiser and the old elites. When all parties were abolished and civil liberties suspended following the Reichstag fire and Hitler's grab for absolute power, Krupp found that he and the rest of the old elites were in the grip of the Party; the movement they had hoped to ride back into power upon had instead ridden them. Always flexible, Krupp cooperated with the new dictatorship. 

Hitler had tried to gain entry to the Krupp factories in 1929, but was rebuffed because Krupp felt he would see some of the secret armament work there and reveal it to the world. Bertha Krupp never liked Hitler even though she never complained when the company's bottom line rose through the armaments contracts and production.  She referred to him as "that certain gentleman" (Dieser gewisse Herr) and pleaded illness when Hitler came on an official tour in 1934. Her daughter Irmgard acted as hostess.

World War II

Krupp suffered failing health from 1939 onwards, and a stroke left him partially paralysed in 1941.  He became a figurehead until he formally handed over the running of the business to his son Alfried in 1943.   Krupp industries, under both his leadership and later that of his son, was offered facilities in eastern Europe and made extensive use of forced labor during the war.

On 25 July 1943 the Royal Air Force attacked the Krupp Works with 627 heavy bombers, dropping 2,032 long tons of bombs in an Oboe-marked attack. Upon his arrival at the works the next morning, Krupp suffered a fit from which he never recovered.

Nuremberg Trials

Following the Allied victory, plans to prosecute Gustav Krupp as a war criminal at the 1945 Nuremberg Trials were dropped because by then he was bedridden and senile. Despite his personal absence from the prisoners' dock, however, Krupp remained technically still under indictment and liable to prosecution in subsequent proceedings.

Death

He died at his residence near Werfen, Salzburg in Austria on 16 January 1950. His widow died in 1957. He had eight children including Alfried Krupp von Bohlen und Halbach (1907–1967), the last owner of Krupp (succeeded by his Alfried Krupp von Bohlen und Halbach Foundation).

See also

 Secret Meeting of 20 February 1933

References

External links

 

1870 births
1950 deaths
Businesspeople from The Hague
Gustav
German steel industry businesspeople
German industrialists
German untitled nobility
German monarchists
German nationalists
German people of World War II
Members of the Prussian House of Lords
Recipients of the Order of St. Sava
Heidelberg University alumni
Nazis
German fascists
People declared mentally unfit for court